Holiday Report (German: Urlaubsreport - Worüber Reiseleiter nicht sprechen dürfen) is a 1971 West German comedy film directed by Ernst Hofbauer and starring Sybil Danning, Astrid Frank and Werner Abrolat. It was produced by Wolf C. Hartwig's Rapid Film, in an attempt to capitalise on the success of the company's hit Schoolgirl Report series.

Cast
 Sybil Danning as Ina, die Anhalterin 
 Astrid Frank as Andrea 
 Werner Abrolat as Wieland 
 Laurence Bien as Miguel 
 Josef Fröhlich as Ignaz Schneider, der Urlaubspfarrer 
 Max Grießer as Xaver 
 Wolf Harnisch as Fred 
 Hans Hass Jr. as Maxl 
 Helen Vita as Gitta Mitterer 
 Ralf Wolter as Horst-Dieter Mitterer 
 Harald Baerow as Steinlechner 
 Nadine De Rangot as Karla 
 Karin Götz as blonde Nichte von Tante Paula
 Josef Moosholzer as Wirt des Gasthofs, wo Ina mit Jürgen übernachtet 
 Gernot Möhner as Franz 
 Juliane Rom-Sock as Helga 
 Marianne Sock as Helga 
 Véronique Vendell as Tisch-Tänzerin bei Après-Ski Party 
 Horst Heuck as Jürgen 
 Monika Rohde as Püppi 
 Evelyne Traeger as Renate Wiesbeck
 Margot Mahler
 Elisabeth Volkmann
 Jochen Mann
 Oliver Domnik
 Michael von Harbach

References

Bibliography 
 Bergfelder, Tim. International Adventures: German Popular Cinema and European Co-Productions in the 1960s. Berghahn Books, 2005.

External links 
 

1971 films
1970s sex comedy films
German sex comedy films
West German films
1970s German-language films
Films directed by Ernst Hofbauer
Films about vacationing
Constantin Film films
1971 comedy films
1970s German films